Honor suicide can mean:
 Honor suicide, a form of suicide motivated by personal honor
 Forced suicide, a form of honor killing in which the victim is pressured into committing suicide